Khungiya (Kaitag: Хъвангей) is a rural locality (a selo) in Madzhalissky Selsoviet, Kaytagsky District, Republic of Dagestan, Russia. The population was 362 as of 2010. There are 4 streets.

Geography 
Khungiya is located 4 km southwest of Madzhalis (the district's administrative centre) by road. Gaziya and Mizhigli are the nearest rural localities.

Nationalities 
Dargins live there.

References 

Rural localities in Kaytagsky District